Ezer Griffiths OBE, FRS (27 November 1888 – 14 February 1962) was a Welsh physicist most noted for his work on the insulation properties of metals, heat transference, evaporation and refrigeration.

Education and early life
Griffiths was born in Aberdare in 1888 to a colliery mechanic, and from 1901 to 1906 he was educated at Aberdare Intermediate School. He graduated to University College of South Wales and Monmouthshire and studied under Ernest Howard Griffiths.

Career
On leaving Cardiff, he gained a post in the National Physical Laboratory in Teddington.

Griffiths spent his entire career studying the physical theory of heat. His initial works focused on the effects of heat on metal at low temperatures, in conjuncture with his tutor, Ernest Griffiths. His later work on refrigeration would enable the transportation of fruit and meats from Australia and New Zealand to Europe.

References

1888 births
1962 deaths
Welsh physicists
Fellows of the Royal Society
Officers of the Order of the British Empire